This is the results breakdown of the local elections held in the Canary Islands on 24 May 2015. The following tables show detailed results in the autonomous community's most populous municipalities, sorted alphabetically.

Opinion polls

Overall

City control
The following table lists party control in the most populous municipalities, including provincial capitals (shown in bold). Gains for a party are displayed with the cell's background shaded in that party's colour.

Municipalities

Arona
Population: 79,890

Las Palmas de Gran Canaria
Population: 382,283

San Cristóbal de La Laguna
Population: 153,009

Santa Cruz de Tenerife
Population: 205,279

Telde
Population: 102,076

Island Cabildos

See also
2015 Canarian regional election

References

Canary Islands
2015